The Soledar Salt Mines (also called Artemsil Salt Mines after the State Enterprise Association Artemsil that operates the mines) are located in the city/suburb of Soledar in the Bakhmut municipality in Donetsk Oblast, Ukraine.

The largest resembles a hangar of about  length and  width and height, and has accommodated soccer matches and the inflation of a hot air balloon.

The temperature underground is constant at 14–15 °C, with 14.93 PSI air pressure and 60% humidity regardless of the time of the year, giving rise to claims of healing properties for lung conditions.

Many of the chambers are exquisitely decorated with carvings in the salt rock. There are accommodation areas and even a church.

History
The mining of salt started in the town of Soledar in the 19th century.

Russian invasion of Ukraine 

During the Battle of Soledar on 5 January 2023, the Wagner Group and Russian Armed Forces took parts of Soledar's east, forcing the Armed Forces of Ukraine to step back and take up defences further west and in the central parts of Soledar. On 10 January 2023, pro-Russian outlets, including Wagner Group leader Yevgeny Prigozhin, claimed the mines were largely occupied by Russian and Wagner Forces, although these reports were not independently verified. However, between 11 and 13 January 2023, major Russian offensives towards the central part of Soledar made large progress. At the same time, Russian forces north and south of Soledar made large advances over the countryside to the roads, threatening encirclement of the central parts of Soledar. Thus, the Ukrainians were forced to step back to the west of Soledar, putting much of the Soledar Salt Mine under Russian control.

Non-mining activities

See also
  Wieliczka Salt Mine

References

Historical regions in Ukraine
Salt mines in Ukraine
Show mines
Soledar